Jiří Liška (born 12 May 1949 in Havlíčkův Brod) is a Czech politician and veterinarian. He is a former Vice-President of the Czech Senate.

Education
Liška graduated from veterinary school in Brno in 1974.

Career
During the Velvet Revolution, he worked as veterinarian in Prague, Tábor and Jičín. In 1990, he was appointed temporary chairman of the Civic National Committee of Jičín. In 1992, already a member of the Civic Democratic Party, he was elected to the Federal Assembly of Czechoslovakia that was dissolved following the breakup of Czechoslovakia in 1993.

In 1994 - 2002 he served as the mayor of Jičín. Liška was first elected to the Senate of the Czech Republic in 1996, and was reelected in 1998 and 2004 in the Jičín district. Among his functions in the Senate, most notable are the chairmanship of the Civic Democratic Party caucus and Vicepresidency of the Senate.

He is a founding signatory of the Prague Declaration on European Conscience and Communism as well as the Declaration on Crimes of Communism.

Personal life
Jiří Liška is married to Zuzana Liška. They have two sons, Petr and Jan.

References 

1949 births
Living people
Czech anti-communists
Czech veterinarians
Politicians from Havlíčkův Brod
Civic Democratic Party (Czech Republic) Senators